Dudley Creek is a stream in Ripley County in the U.S. state of Missouri. It is a tributary of the Current River.

Dudley Creek is named for Willis Dudley, an early settler.

See also
List of rivers of Missouri

References

Rivers of Ripley County, Missouri
Rivers of Missouri